Western Avenue (also known as Western Avenue & 18th Place) is a station on Metra's BNSF Line located in Pilsen neighborhood of Chicago, Illinois. The station consists of one side platform and one island platform for outbound and inbound trains. The station has no station house, though shelters are provided. Amtrak and BNSF Railway trains run on tracks parallel to the station. As of 2018, Western Avenue is the 208th busiest of Metra's 236 non-downtown stations, with an average of 57 weekday boardings.

Fifty-five trains (27 inbound and 28 outbound) serve Western Ave. & 18th Place on weekdays. On Saturdays, it is served by 22 trains (eleven in each direction) and 16 trains (seven outbound and nine inbound) on Sundays.

Western Avenue station is located near the  Pink Line 'L' station, as well as the  station on the Blue Line's Congress branch. It is also located near an overpass for CSX Transportation and the Norfolk Southern Railway and a BNSF Railway yard.

Bus connections
CTA
18 16th/18th
49 Western (Owl Service)
X49 Western Express (weekday rush hours only)

References

External links

Western Avenue entrance from Google Maps Street View

Metra stations in Chicago
Former Chicago, Burlington and Quincy Railroad stations
Railway stations in the United States opened in 1905
Lower West Side, Chicago